Petr Faldyna (born 11 July 1976 in Frýdlant nad Ostravicí) is a former professional Czech footballer. He was top scorer of the Czech 2. Liga for three consecutive seasons, 2005–06, 2006–07 and 2007–08.

References
 
 Írán? Čína? Střelecké rekordy druhé ligy? Kanonýr už bude hrát jen divizi at iDNES.cz
 
 Profile at Vysočina Jihlava website

Czech footballers
1976 births
Living people
Czech First League players
1. HFK Olomouc players
SFC Opava players
SK Dynamo České Budějovice players
FC Vysočina Jihlava players
FK Senica players
Slovak Super Liga players
Expatriate footballers in Slovakia
Czech expatriate sportspeople in Slovakia
Association football forwards
1. SK Prostějov players
People from Frýdlant nad Ostravicí
Sportspeople from the Moravian-Silesian Region